Beefsteak Nazi or "Roast-beef Nazi" was a term used in Nazi Germany to describe communists and socialists who joined the Nazi Party. Munich-born American historian Konrad Heiden was one of the first to document this phenomenon in his 1936 book Hitler: A Biography, remarking that in the Sturmabteilung (Brownshirts, SA) ranks there were "large numbers of Communists and Social Democrats" and that "many of the storm troops were called 'beefsteaks' – brown outside and red within". The switching of political parties was at times so common that SA men would jest that "[i]n our storm troop there are three Nazis, but we shall soon have spewed them out".

The term was particularly used to designate working class members of the SA who were aligned with Strasserism. The image of these "beefsteak" individuals wearing a brown uniform but having underlying "red" communist and socialist sympathies implied that their allegiance to Nazism was superficial and opportunistic.

After Adolf Hitler became Chancellor of Germany, beefsteak Nazis continued during the suppression of both communists and socialists (represented by the Communist Party of Germany and the Social Democratic Party of Germany, respectively) in the 1930s and the term was popular as early as 1933.

Ernst Röhm and the Sturmabteilung 
Ernst Röhm, SA co-founder and later commander, developed an "expanding Röhm-cult" within the SA ranks through which many members sought a revolutionary socialist regime, radicalizing the SA. Röhm and large segments of the Nazi Party supported the 25-point National Socialist Program for its socialist, revolutionary and anti-capitalist positions, expecting Hitler to fulfill his promises when power was finally attained. Since Röhm had "considerable sympathy with the more socialist aspects of the Nazi programme", "turncoat Communists and Socialists joined the Nazi Party for a number of years, where they were derisively known as 'Beefsteak Nazis'."

Röhm's radicalization came to the forefront in 1933–1934 when he sought to have his plebeian SA troopers engage in permanent or "second revolution" after Hitler had become Chancellor. With 2.5 million stormtroopers under his command by late 1933, Röhm envisaged a purging of the conservative faction, the "Reaktion" in Germany that would entail more nationalization of industry, "worker control of the means of production", and the "confiscation and redistribution of property and wealth of the upper classes." Such ideological and political infighting within the Nazi Party prompted Hitler to have his political rival Röhm and other Nazi socialist radicals executed on the Night of the Long Knives in the summer of 1934.

Some have argued that since most SA members came from working-class families or were unemployed, they were amenable to Marxist-leaning socialism. However, historian Thomas Friedrich argues that repeated efforts by the Communist Party of Germany to appeal to the working-class backgrounds of the SA were "doomed to failure" because most SA men were focused on the cult of Hitler and the destruction of the "Marxist enemy".

Extent 
In some cities, the number of party-switching beefsteak Nazis was thought to be significant. Rudolf Diels, head of the Gestapo from 1933 to 1934, reported that "70 percent" of new SA recruits had been communists in the city of Berlin.

See also 
 August Winnig 
 Ernst Niekisch
 National Bolshevism
 Old Social Democratic Party of Germany
 Strasserism
 Widerstand (magazine)

References 
Notes

Bibliography

 
 
 
 
 
 
 
 
 
 
 
 
 
 
 
 
 

Nazi Party